The UEFA European Under-17 Championship or simply UEFA Under-17 Championship, is an annual football competition contested by the European men's under-17 national teams of the member associations of UEFA.

Spain is the most successful team in this competition, having won nine titles. France are the current champions.

History and format

The current competition format consists of three stages: a qualifying round, an elite round and a final tournament. The first stage takes place in autumn of the previous year, while the elite round is played in spring. The winners of each elite round group join the host team in the final tournament, played in May. Until the 1997 tournament, players born on or after 1 August the year they turned 17 years were eligible to compete. Since the 1998 tournament, the date limit has been moved back to 1 January.
In 2001/2002 the competition was renamed European Under-17 Championship, but the eligibility rules did not change.

Results

UEFA European Under-16 Championship (1982–2001)

UEFA European Under-17 Championship (since 2002)

1No third place match has been played since 2007; losing semi-finalists are listed in alphabetical order.
 1987 Title not awarded.
Key:
a.e.t. – after extra time
g.g. – after golden goal
p – after penalty shoot-out

Performances by countries
As of 2022

1 There was no match to determine 3rd place after the 2006 tournament.
3 Including .
4 Including .
5 Including .

Participating nations
Legend:
 – Champions
 – Runners-up
 – Third place
 – Fourth place
 – Semi-finalists
5th-6th - Fifth to Sixth place
QF – Quarter-finals
GS – Group stage
q – Qualified for upcoming tournament
TBD – To be determined
 ••  – Qualified but withdrew
 •  – Did not qualify
 ×  – Did not enter
 ×  – Withdrew / Banned / Entry not accepted by FIFA
 — Country not affiliated to UEFA at that time
 — Country did not exist or national team was inactive
     – Hosts
     – Not affiliated to FIFA

Comprehensive team results by tournament

UEFA European Under-17 Championship (since 2002)

Men's U-17 World Cup Qualifiers
Legend
1st – Champions
2nd – Runners-up
3rd – Third place
4th – Fourth place
QF – Quarterfinals
R2 – Round 2
R1 – Round 1
     – Hosts
     – Not affiliated to UEFA
q – Qualified for upcoming tournament

Awards

Golden Player Award

For certain tournaments, the official website UEFA.com subsequently named a Golden Player.

See also
UEFA European Championship
UEFA European Under-21 Championship
UEFA European Under-19 Championship

References

External links

UEFA.com

 
European Under-17 Championship
Under-17 association football
European youth sports competitions
Recurring sporting events established in 1982
1982 establishments in Europe